Frama-C stands for Framework for Modular Analysis of C programs. Frama-C is a set of interoperable program analyzers for C programs. Frama-C has been developed by the French Commissariat à l'Énergie Atomique et aux Énergies Alternatives (CEA-List) and Inria. It has also received funding from the Core Infrastructure Initiative. Frama-C, as a static analyzer, inspects programs without executing them. Despite its name, the software is not related to the French project Framasoft.

Architecture 

Frama-C has a modular plugin architecture comparable to that of Eclipse (software) or GIMP.

Frama-C relies on CIL (C Intermediate Language) to generate an abstract syntax tree.
The abstract syntax tree supports annotations written in ANSI/ISO C Specification Language (ACSL).

Several modules can manipulate the abstract syntax tree to add ANSI/ISO C Specification Language (ACSL) annotations. Among frequently used plugins are:

 Value analysis computes a value or a set of possible values for each variable in a program. This plugin uses abstract interpretation techniques and many other plugins make use of its results.
 Jessie verifies properties in a deductive manner. Jessie relies on the Why or Why3 back-end to enable proof obligations to be sent to automatic theorem provers like Z3, Simplify, Alt-Ergo or interactive theorem provers like Coq or Why. Using Jessie, an implementation of bubble-sort or a toy e-voting system can be proved to satisfy their respective specifications.  It uses a separation memory model inspired by separation logic.
 WP (Weakest Precondition) similar to Jessie, verifies properties in a deductive manner.  Unlike Jessie, it focuses on parameterization with regards to the memory model.  WP is designed to cooperate with other Frama-C plugins such as the value analysis plug-in, unlike Jessie that compiles the C program directly into the Why language.  WP can optionally use the Why3 platform to invoke many other automated and interactive provers.
 Impact analysis highlights the impacts of a modification in the C source code.
 Slicing enables slicing of a program. It enables generation of a smaller new C program that preserves some given properties.
 Spare code removes useless code from a C program.
Other plugins are:
 Dominators computes dominators and postdominators of statements.
 From analysis computes functional dependencies.

Features 
Frama-C can be used for the following purposes:

 To understand C code which you have not written. In particular, Frama-C enables one to observe a set of values, slice the program into shorter programs, and navigate in the program.
 To prove formal properties on the code. Using specifications written in ANSI/ISO C Specification Language enables it to ensure properties of the code for any possible behavior. Frama-C handles floating point numbers.
 To enforce coding standards or code conventions on C source code, by means of custom plugin(s)
 To instrument C code against some security flaws

See also 
 SPARK (programming language)

References

External links 

Frama-C discussion list
Frama-C Bug Tracking System

C programming language family
Formal methods tools
Linux software
OCaml software
Science software that uses GTK
Software testing tools
Software that uses Cairo (graphics)
Software using the LGPL license
Static program analysis tools